Teesside Archives holds the archives for the Teesside area. The archives are held at Exchange House, Exchange Square, Middlesbrough, and run by Middlesbrough Borough Council. It was created in 1974 under Cleveland County and is now funded by Hartlepool Borough Council, Stockton Borough Council, Middlesbrough Council and Redcar & Cleveland Borough Council.

References

County record offices in England
Teesside
History of Yorkshire